En Aaloda Seruppa Kaanom is a 2017 Tamil-language comedy drama film written and directed by K. P. Jagan. Thamizh, Anandhi, and Yogi Babu play the film's lead roles, amongst an ensemble cast. The film began production in February 2017 and was released on 17 November 2017. This film had music composed by Ishaan Dev. It was below average at the box office.

Plot
Sandhya (Anandhi) loses her slippers and pleads the conductor to the stop the bus and says that her slippers were bought by her father Mohanrajan (Jayaprakash). As the conductor refuses to stop, Krishnan (Thamizh), who is in love with Sandhya for a long time, jumps from the running bus to get the slippers, but they go missing. Meanwhile, Mohanrajan gets kidnapped in Syria, and a godwoman says that Mohanrajan will be safe as soon as Sandhya gets her lost pair of slippers.

Cast

 Thamizh (earlier credited as Pakoda Pandi) as Krishnan Kithan 
 Anandhi as Sandhya
 Yogi Babu as 'Remo' Ravi
 K. S. Ravikumar as Politician
 Rekha as Sandhya's mother
 Jayaprakash as Mohanarajan
 Bala Saravanan as Mahesh
 Livingston as Bhai
 Singampuli as Soosai
 Abhirami as Sandhya's friend
 Kadhal Sukumar as Bus Conductor
 Thalapathy Dinesh as Don
 Devipriya as Malavika
 Rajendranath as Head Constable 
 Supergood Subramani as Police Writer
 MooMaaran as Wine Shop Owner
 Subramani as Doctor
 Udhayabhanu as Sandhya's grandfather
 Kayal Devaraj as Tricycle Beggar
 Siththan as Saloon Shop Owner

Production
In December 2016, director K. P. Jagan revealed that he would make a comeback as a director and chose to cast Anandhi in the lead role of his next film. Jagan also selected Thamizh, previously credited Pandi in films including Pasanga (2009), to play the lead role in the film, while Yogi Babu was also picked for a leading role. Production began in Cuddalore at the end of 2016. The film's title and first look was released in April 2017. This film Music Rights were Sold to Gautham Vasudev Menon's Ondraga Entertainment.

Soundtrack

Release 
The Times of India gave the film two-and-a-half stars out of five and wrote that "While we expect inventiveness, Jagannath gives us inanity. Neither the events that happen during the hero's search for the missing slipper nor the characters he comes across in his adventures are interesting".

References

External links
 

2017 films
2010s Tamil-language films
Indian comedy-drama films
2017 comedy-drama films
2017 comedy films